The Tseung Kwan O line is one of the eleven lines of the MTR system in Hong Kong, indicated by the colour purple.

The line runs from North Point on the Hong Kong Island to the new town of Tseung Kwan O. It bifurcates east of Tseung Kwan O station into two branches, one northward to Po Lam and one southward to LOHAS Park. The Tseung Kwan O Depot at LOHAS Park is responsible for the maintenance of the line's rolling stock.

During the morning peak period, the Tseung Kwan O line uses 15 trains to maintain a frequency of 2.5 minutes between Tseung Kwan O and North Point.

Route map

Route description 
The Tseung Kwan O line is the first MTR line with no tracks on viaducts. It was the only line with tracks completely in tunnels until the completion of LOHAS Park station, which there are two short sections nearby that are not in tunnels. The stations of Yau Tong, Po Lam and LOHAS Park are at ground level, but are completely shielded to minimise noise to the surrounding development. The rest of the line has its tracks located underground.

The western terminus of the line is North Point, providing cross-platform interchange together with the neighbouring station of Quarry Bay. East of Quarry Bay, the line passes under Victoria Harbour to Yau Tong station, a station serving the East Kowloon neighbourhood of the same name, using the rail tunnel of the Eastern Harbour Crossing. From Yau Tong, the line passes through the Black Hill Tunnels to enter Tseung Kwan O New Town at Tiu Keng Leng.

Within Tseung Kwan O new town, the line splits into two branches east of Tseung Kwan O station. One branch reaches Hang Hau and Po Lam stations in the northern part of the new town, whereas the southward branch connects LOHAS Park station in Area 86. LOHAS Park is a large residential development built above the Tseung Kwan O Depot, where the trains of the line are maintained.

Train operations 
Operation of the line is relatively complex because of the split into two branches at Tseung Kwan O.

The majority of trains on the line run through from Po Lam to North Point and vice versa. Through service between LOHAS Park and North Point is only provided during rush hour; during non-peak periods, LOHAS Park is only served by "shuttle trains" that terminate at Tiu Keng Leng, operating at 12-minute intervals. Passengers travelling to and from LOHAS Park during non-peak hours are required to change trains at Tiu Keng Leng or Tseung Kwan O in order to continue their journey.

Train headways are as follows:
 Rush hour: One through train to/from LOHAS Park after two trains to/from Po Lam
 North Point - Po Lam trains: every 2.5 or 4 minutes
 North Point - LOHAS Park trains: every 7–8 minutes
 combined headway between North Point and Tseung Kwan O is 2.5 minutes.
 Non-peak period:
 Mon-Fri, Sat (10:00-20:00) and Sun (09:00-20:00)
 North Point - Po Lam trains: every 4 minutes
 Tiu Keng Leng - LOHAS Park shuttle trains: every 12 minutes
 No through service from LOHAS Park to North Point, vice versa
 Every day between 20:00 and 00:00
 North Point - Po Lam trains: every 5 minutes
 Tiu Keng Leng - LOHAS Park shuttle trains: every 12 minutes
 No through service from LOHAS Park to North Point, vice versa
 Every day after 00:00
 North Point to Po Lam trains: every 6 minutes
 Po Lam to North Point trains: every 8–9 minutes
 Tiu Keng Leng - LOHAS Park shuttle trains: every 12 minutes

History 
The Tseung Kwan O line was planned to serve the new town of Tseung Kwan O and was first proposed in 1981 as part of the Junk Bay New Town Transport Study. The report proposed four corridors, all of which called for the Kwun Tong line to be extended to Lam Tin station and placed the terminus of the Tseung Kwan O line at the vicinity of Tsui Ping Estate. The construction cost was estimated at HK$3 billion. The construction of the Tseung Kwan O line was approved by the Hong Kong Government in 1985 and under the 1985 plan, a  branch line from Lam Tin station to Tseung Kwan O station, consisting of 5 or 6 stations, was to be built beginning in 1992 and to open by the end of 1996. This plan was cancelled by the MTR Corporation in August 1990.

MTR re-proposed the line in 1993, and the plan was approved by the Hong Kong Executive Council on 20 October 1998. Construction commenced on 24 April 1999 and the line opened on 18 August 2002, at a cost of HK$18 billion. The new line took over the cross-harbour segment, via the Eastern Harbour Crossing to North Point station, from the Kwun Tong line. The Kwun Tong line was extended to Yau Tong and Tiu Keng Leng stations to interchange with the new line.

Trains 
The line is served by the K-Stock and M-Trains. The K-Stock trains were manufactured by a consortium of Hyundai Rotem and Mitsubishi Corporation, and were expected to be quieter and to use energy generated from deceleration.

Although tailor-made for the line, the K-Stock trains actually ran on the Kwun Tong line from launch through April 2010, and the original M-Trains ran on this line instead. The K-Stock trains were finally transferred to this line in April 2010.

Stations
This is a list of the stations on the Tseung Kwan O line.

List

Notes

Future development 

The Tseung Kwan O line will probably be extended to Tamar station and interchange with an extended Tung Chung line there. This is according to the "interchange scheme" devised for the North Island line, which would also see the line serve stations at Fortress Hill, Causeway Bay North and Exhibition Centre, the latter of which would provide a connection with the Sha Tin to Central Link extension of the  North South Corridor (East Rail Line to Admiralty). Construction is not expected to begin before 2021.

Under an earlier proposal, called the "swap scheme", the line would have taken over the section of the Island line from Fortress Hill to Kennedy Town; with the remaining section east of Tin Hau being transferred to the Tung Chung line. This was rejected as the existing Island line would be interrupted and require an interchange.

See also 
 Transport in Hong Kong
 List of areas of Hong Kong

References

External links 

Success Story - Tseung Kwan O Extension Project, MTRCL, 2005 

 
MTR lines
Tseung Kwan O
Railway lines opened in 2002
1432 mm gauge railways in Hong Kong
1500 V DC railway electrification
2002 establishments in Hong Kong